An incomplete list of the tallest structures in Spain. This list contains all types of structures.

Please expand and correct!

See also
 List of tallest buildings in Spain
 List of tallest buildings in Madrid
 List of tallest buildings in Barcelona
 List of tallest buildings in Valencia

External links
 http://skyscraperpage.com/diagrams/?searchID=37735334
 List of air traffic obstacles in Spain

Spain
Tallest structures in Spain, List of